Keel Mountain is a mountain in Linn County, Oregon, USA. Variant names include Green Mountain and Green Ridge.

References

Mountains of Oregon
Mountains of Linn County, Oregon